An amplifier is a device for increasing the power of an electronic signal. 

Amplifier may also refer to:

Other amplifier types
 Fluidic amplifier
 Mechanical amplifier
 Optical amplifier
 Pneumatic amplifier
 Torque amplifier

Music
 Amplifier (band), an English rock band 
 Amplifier (Amplifier album), 2004
 Amplifier (Dance Exponents album), 1986
 "Amplifier", a song by Imran Khan, 2009
 "Amplifier", a song by the dB's from the 1982 album Repercussion
 "Amplifier", a song by Manafest from the 2017 album Stones

See also

 Amplification (disambiguation)